Natural resistance-associated macrophage protein 1 is a protein that in humans is encoded by the SLC11A1 gene.

Function 

This gene is a member of the solute carrier family 11 (proton-coupled divalent metal ion transporters) family and encodes a multi-pass membrane protein. The protein functions as a divalent transition metal (iron and manganese) transporter involved in iron metabolism and host resistance to certain pathogens. Mutations in this gene have been associated with susceptibility to infectious diseases such as tuberculosis and leprosy, and inflammatory diseases such as rheumatoid arthritis and Crohn's disease. Alternatively spliced variants that encode different protein isoforms have been described but the full-length nature of only one has been determined.

See also 
 Solute carrier family

References

Further reading 

 
 
 
 
 
 
 
 
 
 
 
 
 
 
 
 

Solute carrier family